Naga dynasty may refer to:

 Nagas of Padmavati
 Nagas of Vidisha
 the rulers of the legendary Naga Kingdom